The New Hope–Lambertville Bridge, officially called the New Hope–Lambertville Toll Supported Bridge, is a six-span, -long bridge spanning the Delaware River that connects Lambertville, New Jersey and New Hope, Pennsylvania. The current steel truss bridge was constructed in 1904 at a cost of $63,818.81. It is owned and maintained as a toll-free bridge by the Delaware River Joint Toll Bridge Commission.

Structure

Three of its piers are stone filled and built on timber cribbing. The bridge's abutment, which is from the 1814 bridge, is square blocked masonry. Finally, utilities on the bridge include lighting for the walkway and an eight-inch (203 mm)  diameter sewer line.

History

The original -long and -wide wooden covered bridge was built on September 12, 1814, replacing the service once provided by Coryell's Ferry. Its designer, Lewis Wernwag, was nationally known for his covered bridges.
The flood of 1841 heavily damaged the original bridge. A second wooden covered bridge was constructed in 1842, but was destroyed during the flood of 1903. As was the case with several of the Delaware River's other bridges at the time, the flood encouraged replacing the wooden structure with a modern steel bridge. Thus, the superstructure of the New Hope–Lambertville Bridge dates to 1904, when its steel truss spans were first built. The cost of the 1904 bridge was $63,818.81, several thousand dollars less than the $67,936.37 needed to build the 1814 structure.

In 1919, the Commission For the Elimination of Toll Bridges bought the bridge, freeing the financially struggling private company from its obligations. The bridge has been toll-free since that time.

Prior to 1934, trolleys of the New Jersey and Pennsylvania Traction Company, and later the Trenton-Princeton Traction Company, used the New Hope–Lambertville Bridge to cross back into New Jersey.

The New Hope–Lambertville Bridge was one of the few structures not devastated by the flood of 1955, the greatest that the Delaware River had ever experienced. It did, however, require about a month of repairs, reopening on September 22, 1955.

Realignment
For many years the New Hope–Lambertville Bridge carried U.S. Route 202 over the Delaware River. However, in 1971, U.S. Route 202 was realigned at Magill's Hill between the Rabbit Run Canal bridge and the Phillip's Mill community on the Pennsylvania side. The New Hope-Lambertville Toll Bridge currently carries Route 202, while the New Hope–Lambertville Toll Supported Bridge connects the re-designated Pennsylvania Route 179 with New Jersey Route 179.

Improvement Project
As part of its celebration of the 100th anniversary of the New Hope–Lambertville Bridge in 2004, the Delaware River Joint Toll Bridge Commission announced the completion of a major revitalization project that had begun in late 2003. The contract had been awarded to J.D. Eckman, Inc. for the amount of $6,249,207.50. Renovations included improving the pedestrian walkway with new flooring and lighting, fixing the bridge's sewer line, replacing steel members, and blast-cleaning and painting the bridge's structural steel. During construction, bridge traffic fell to 9,700. Beginning in January 2004, shuttle service was offered at no cost to travelers. The bridge reopened June 7, 2004, one week ahead of schedule, and was named "2004 Project of the Year" by the Delaware Valley Section of the American Society of Highway Engineers. The final cost of the project was $6,305,269.

See also

References

Sources
Richman, Steven M. (2003). The Bridges of New Jersey, New Brunswick: Rutgers University Press. Pages 78–79. .

External links
Advanced Hydrologic Prediction Service

Delaware River Joint Toll Bridge Commission
1904 establishments in New Jersey
1904 establishments in Pennsylvania
Bridges completed in 1904
Bridges in Bucks County, Pennsylvania
Bridges in Hunterdon County, New Jersey
Bridges over the Delaware River
Former toll bridges in New Jersey
Former toll bridges in Pennsylvania
Interstate vehicle bridges in the United States
Road bridges in New Jersey
Road bridges in Pennsylvania
Lambertville, New Jersey
Steel bridges in the United States
Truss bridges in the United States
U.S. Route 202